Live at the Zodiac is the name of Graham Coxon's first concert DVD and a live EP. It was recorded at the Oxford Zodiac on 3 June 2004 during his first full length UK tour after parting with Blur in 2003.

This shoot was originally intended to gather footage to make a promotional video for the single "Freakin' Out".  This was idea abandoned but EMI decided that they would release the concert as a whole the following year.

The photos found on the sleeve were taken by legendary rock photographer Penny Smith who shot the band during various points on the same UK tour.

Track listing

DVD
Live at the Zodiac
"Escape Song"
"Spectacular"
"No Good Time"
"I Wish"
"That's All I Wanna Do"
"Bottom Bunk"
"Bittersweet Bundle of Misery"
"Girl Done Gone"
"All Over Me"
"Bitter Tears"
"People Of The Earth"
"All I Wanna Do Is Listen To Yuz"
"Freakin' Out"
"Who The Fuck?"

Acoustic set at the ICA art exhibition, October 2004:
"Been Smoking Too Long"
"Latte"
"Live Line"
"Baby You're Out Of Your Mind"
"All Over Me"
"My Little Girl"
"Here I Go"

Promo Videos:
"Bittersweet Bundle Of Misery"
"Spectacular"
"Freakin' Out"

EP
"Freakin' Out" - 4:02
"That's All I Wanna Do" - 4:57
"No Good Time" - 3:24

Band line up
Graham Coxon: Guitar & Vocals
Stephen Gilchrist: Drums
Toby MacFarlaine: Bass guitar & Vocals
Sean Read: Keyboards
Owen Thomas: Guitar

External links
EP Download site

Graham Coxon albums
2005 debut EPs
Live EPs
2005 live albums
2005 video albums
Live video albums
Music video compilation albums
2005 compilation albums